{{Speciesbox
|image =
|genus = Acer
|parent = Acer sect. Macrantha
|species = maximowiczii
|authority  = Pax 1899
|synonyms_ref = <ref>[https://powo.science.kew.org/taxon/urn:lsid:ipni.org:names:781387-1 Plants of the World Online, Acer maximowiczii Pax" ]</ref>
|synonyms = Acer maximowiczii subsp. porphyrophyllum W.P.FangAcer pectinatum subsp. maximowiczii (Pax) A.E.Murray Acer urophyllum Maxim.
}}Acer maximowiczii is an Asian species of maple. It has been found only in China (Gansu, Guangxi, Guizhou, Henan, Hubei, Hunan, Qinghai, Shaanxi, Shanxi, Sichuan).Acer maximowiczii'' is a tree up to 12 meters tall, with dark brown bark. Leaves are non-compound, thin and papery, up to 11 cm wide and 9 cm across, with 5 lobes and double teeth.

References

External links
line drawing for Flora of China drawings 5 + 6 at bottom

maximowiczii
Plants described in 1899
Flora of China